The governor of Cebu is the chief executive of the provincial government of Cebu, Philippines. The first governor appointed by the Spanish Crown was Miguel Lopez de Legazpi, and during the American Era, Julio Llorente became governor on April 16, 1899, although Luis Flores and Arcadio Maxilom served in the same position in 1898 and 1899, respectively.

The current governor is Gwendolyn Garcia, under PDP–Laban. She previously served as a member of the House of Representatives of the Philippines, representing the third congressional district of Cebu from 2013 to 2019 and was the governor from 2004 to 2013.

History 
On August 6, 1569, King Philip II appointed Miguel Lopez de Legazpi as the first governor of the province of Cebu. His appointment was conducted just a few years after the Spanish settlement was established in the island.

The Cebu provincial government was divided into rival factions before the impending U.S. invasion in 1899. On December 30, 1898, Luis Flores was elected and assumed office as governor the next day, with his office being confirmed in another election held on January 10, 1899. Flores remained governor outside of the city even while Julio Llorente became governor on April 16, 1899. The situation was further complicated when on March 29, 1899, General Arcadio Maxilom was appointed military governor during the resistance against the American forces.

List of governors of Cebu

References

External links 
Governor of the Province of Cebu

Cebu